Rose o' Paradise is a 1918 silent film directed by James Young and starring Bessie Barriscale. It was produced by Paralta Plays and distributed through W. W. Hodkinson Corporation, General Film Company and Pathe-Freres.

Cast
Bessie Barriscale - Virginia Singleton
Howard C. Hickman - Lafe Grandoken
David Hartford - Jordon Morse
Norman Kerry - Theodore King
Edythe Chapman - Peg Grandoken
William Delmar - Maudlin Bates
Lucille Young - Molly Merriweather
Arthur Allardt - Thomas Singleton

Preservation status
The film is preserved in the Cinematheque Francais archive.

References

External links
 Rose o' Paradise at IMDb.com

1918 films
American silent feature films
American black-and-white films
Films directed by James Young
Pathé films
Silent American drama films
1918 drama films
Films distributed by W. W. Hodkinson Corporation
Films based on works by Grace Miller White
1910s American films
1910s English-language films
English-language drama films